Sadowski, Sadovsky, or Sadouski is a common Polish or Belarusian surname. It means "from the orchard" or "from Sadow" (i.e., from one of the towns named Sadów in Poland). Alternative spellings include the Belarusian (Садоўскі, Sadoǔski) and Lithuanian (Sadauskas) versions; as well as Sadowsky, Sodowsky, Sadovsky and Sandusky. 

Sadowski is one of the many surnames associated with the Nałęcz coat-of-arms in Polish heraldry.

People

Athletes

Baseball 
 Bob Sadowski (1937–2017), an MLB third baseman
 Bob Sadowski (1938–2018), an MLB pitcher
 Clint Sodowsky (born 1972), an MLB pitcher
 Ed Sadowski (1931–1993), an MLB catcher
 Jim Sadowski (born 1951), an MLB pitcher
 Ryan Sadowski (born 1982), an MLB pitcher
 Ted Sadowski (1936–1993), an MLB pitcher

Other sports 
 Ed Sadowski (1917–1990), an NBA player
 Eddie Sadowski (1915–1992), an NBL player
 Robert Sadowski, a player in the 1938 Romania national football team
 Roman Sadovsky (born 1999), Canadian figure skater
 Troy Sadowski (born 1965), an NFL player
 Zoi Sadowski-Synnott (born 2001), New Zealand snowboarder

Actors
 Fanny Sadowski (1826–1906), Italian stage actress
 Jonathan Sadowski (born 1979), an American actor
 Matt Sadowski (born 1978), a Canadian actor
 Prov Sadovsky - stage name of Prov Mikhailovich Yermilov (1818–1872), a Russian actor 
 Przemysław Sadowski, Polish actor
 Thomas Sadoski (born 1976), an American actor

Musicians
 Mariana Sadovska (born 1972), a Ukrainian musician
 Robert Sadowski (died 2006), a Polish guitarist

Military
 Jan Jagmin-Sadowski (1895-1977), a Polish general
 Joseph J. Sadowski (1917–1944), a World War II U.S. Army soldier

Science and technology
 George Sadowsky (born 1936), an American computer scientist
 Mikhail Sadovsky (1904–1994), a Soviet physicist

Artists
 Stephen Sadowski, a Canadian comic book artist
 Wiktor Sadowski (born 1956), a Polish graphic designer

Politicians
 George G. Sadowski (1903–1961), a U.S. Representative from Michigan
 Piatro Sadoǔski (born 1941), the first ambassador of independent Belarus to Germany in 1992–1994

Others 
 Anthony Sadowski American Pioneer 1736
 Jacob Sodowski, an eighteenth-century Polish-American fur trader
 Otto von Sadovszky (1925-2004), a college professor of anthropology in southern California

Places
 Szadowski Młyn, a village in Poland
 18702 Sadowski, an asteroid
 Various places named Sadowo, Sadowa, Sadovo, Sadovy, and Sadowice in Poland
 Various places named Sandusky

Miscellaneous
 Sadowsky, a brand of guitars
 The Sadowski Causeway in Key Colony Beach, Florida
 Margaret "Legs" Sadovsky - a character in Foxfire: Confessions of a Girl Gang, played by Angelina Jolie in the film adaptation.

References

Polish-language surnames